Kevin Clinton is a retired American soccer goalkeeper who played professionally in the North American Soccer League and third American Soccer League.

Career
Clinton graduated from Ramapo High School in Spring Valley, New York, where he was an All County goalkeeper his senior season.  He then attended Ulster County Community College.  In 1979, the Tampa Bay Rowdies selected Clinton in the second round (twenty-third overall) of the North American Soccer League draft.  The Hartford Hellions of the Major Indoor Soccer League also drafted Clinton, but he chose to sign with the Rowdies.  During his three years with the Rowdies, Clinton spent most of the time as backup to Winston DuBose, seeing playing time only during the indoor seasons.  In 1988, he returned to the Rowdies, this time in the American Soccer League, but again spent the season as backup to DuBose.

In 1992, Clinton graduated from the University of South Florida with a bachelor's degree in engineering and computer science.  Since then he has served in a variety of position in the information technology field.

Personal life 
His son Kyle Clinton played for the Tampa Bay Rowdies in 2013 and 2014.

Notes

External links
 NASL stats

Living people
American soccer players
American Soccer League (1988–89) players
Association football goalkeepers
North American Soccer League (1968–1984) indoor players
North American Soccer League (1968–1984) players
Tampa Bay Rowdies draft picks
Tampa Bay Rowdies (1975–1993) players
Year of birth missing (living people)